Pir Kuh-e Sofla (also Romanized as Pīr Kūh-e Soflá; also known as Pīr Kūh-e Pā’īn) is a village in Pir Kuh Rural District, Deylaman District, Siahkal County, Gilan Province, Iran. At the 2006 census, its population was 183, in 48 families.

References 

Populated places in Siahkal County